Max Shali Nghilifa Hamata (born in the Katutura suburb of Windhoek) is a controversial Namibian journalist and muckraker. He is the editor of The Confidente. Hamata previously worked as the editor of a Namibian weekly tabloid newspaper Informante, owned by TrustCo.

References

External links
The Confidente

Living people
People from Windhoek
Ovambo people
Namibian newspaper editors
Namibian newspaper journalists
Year of birth missing (living people)